The 1999 FedEx Championship Series season, the twenty-first in the CART era of U.S. open-wheel racing, consisted of 20 races, beginning in Homestead, Florida on March 21 and concluding in Fontana, California on October 31.  The season was marred by the fatal accidents of Gonzalo Rodríguez during practice for the Laguna Seca round and Greg Moore during the Marlboro 500 in Fontana, in addition to countless injuries that took several drivers out of championship contention.

Juan Pablo Montoya, in his first season at CART after two successful seasons in Formula 3000, won the championship in his first season, as well as Rookie of the Year honors, the second and final driver to win both awards in the same season, after Nigel Mansell in 1993.  The season ended in a tie, with Montoya and Dario Franchitti both having 212 championship points, though Montoya broke the tie-breaker due to having seven wins, over Franchitti's three.

With Al Unser Jr. running his final season in the series, 1999 was the last year in which the Al Unser name was on the CART grid. Also, this was the first season without Bobby Rahal on the grid.

Constructors 
The following teams and drivers competed in the 1999 CART Championship Series season.

Season summary

Schedule

– Cleveland was scheduled for 211 miles, but was shortened due to the 2-hour time limit.
– Detroit was scheduled for 176 miles, but was shortened due to the 2-hour time limit.
– Vancouver was scheduled for 160 miles, but was shortened due to the 2-hour time limit.
 Oval/Speedway
 Dedicated road course
 Temporary street circuit

Race results

Final driver standings

Note:
  Gonzalo Rodríguez died in qualifying at Laguna Seca Raceway after his car crashed into a barrier and flipped while trying to navigate the track's corkscrew turn, suffering a fatal basilar skull fracture.  He was 28 years old.
  Greg Moore died in the season finale at California Speedway after a crash in the early laps.  His car lost control coming off Turn 2, flipped over, impacted the inside wall, and flipped several more times.  Greg suffered fatal head and internal injuries from the violent accident.  He was 24 years old.

Nation's Cup 

 Top result per race counts towards Nation's Cup.

Chassis Constructor's Cup

Engine Manufacturer's Cup

Driver Breakdown

Media
In the United States, CART continued its coverage on ESPN, but the broadcast booth changed voices. Paul Page handled lap-by-lap commentary, taking over for Bob Varsha, who had departed for Speed Channel. Newly-retired racer Parker Johnstone joined him with color commentary. During his suspension from the first race of the season, Paul Tracy joined Page and Johnstone in the booth. Jon Beekhuis and Gary Gerould were pit reporters.

See also
 1999 Toyota Atlantic Championship season
 1999 Indianapolis 500
 1999 Indy Racing League
 1999 Indy Lights season

References

 
 
 

Champ Car seasons
CART
 
CART